Henkel is a surname. Notable people with the surname include:
 Andrea Henkel (born 1977), German biathlete
 Caesar Carl Hans Henkel (1837–1913), German-born South African forester, cartographer, painter, soldier and botanist
 Christoph Henkel (born 1958), German billionaire businessman
 Claudia Henkel (born 1983), South African beauty queen and model
 Ernest Henkel (1873–1935), manager of the Metropolitan Opera
 Friedrich Karl Henkel (1848–1930), German entrepreneur and company founder
 Heike Henkel (born 1964), German former athlete
 Heinrich Henkel (born 1896), German First World War flying ace
 Henner Henkel (1915–1942), German tennis player
 Herbert L. Henkel, CEO of Ingersoll Rand
 Hugo Henkel (1881–1952), German businessman and  former CEO of German company Henkel
 Joerg Henkel, German engineer
 John Spurgeon Henkel (1871–1962), South African botanist and forester
 Jost Henkel (1909–1961), German businessman
 Kim Henkel, American screenwriter, film director and producer
 Kim Henkel, creator of ZTreeWin
 Konrad Henkel (1915–1999), German businessman
 Manuela Henkel (born 1974), German cross-country skier
 Rainer Henkel (born 1964), former freestyle swimmer

See also
 Henckel von Donnersmarck, a Silesian noble family
 Henckel-Rennen, a horse race in Germany
 J. A. Henckels, a knife manufacturer in Germany
 Henkle v. Gregory, a federal lawsuit that ended in a 2002 agreement

German-language surnames
Surnames from given names